The Wanderers is a novel by Ingrid Rimland published in 1977 loosely based upon her own experiences from growing up in a Mennonite community in the Ukraine. Rimland wanted to write a novel about her people, and The Wanderers tells the story of the plight of Mennonite women caught in the social upheavals of revolution and war. The novel traces the decimation of a pacifist people during the Russian Revolution, anarchy, famine, the Stalinist purges, escape from the Ukraine, and eventual resettlement in the rain forests of Paraguay.

The novel remains Rimland's most acclaimed book. It earned her the California Literature Medal Award for best fiction in 1977.

References

Mennonitism in Paraguay
Mennonitism in Ukraine
1977 American novels
Novels set in Ukraine
Novels set in the Russian Revolution
Novels set in Paraguay
Novels about religion
Novels based on actual events
Russian Mennonite diaspora in South America